Phoebe Jane Elizabeth Tonkin (born 12 July 1989) is an Australian actress. She is known for portraying Cleo Sertori in H2O: Just Add Water, Fiona Maxwell in Tomorrow, When the War Began, Faye Chamberlain in The Secret Circle, and Hayley Marshall in The CW series The Vampire Diaries and its spin-off series The Originals.

Early life
Tonkin was born in Sydney, New South Wales, and grew up in the suburb of Mosman. When she was four, she attended dance courses in classical ballet, hip hop, contemporary dance and tap dance. At the age of 12, Tonkin began courses at the Australian Theatre for Young People (ATYP) at the Wharf Theatre. Tonkin graduated from Queenwood School for Girls.

Career

2000s: Breakthrough with H2O
In 2005, Tonkin was cast in the role of Cleo Sertori on the Australian children's television series H2O: Just Add Water, which follows the lives of three teenage girls who turn into mermaids. She worked on improving her swimming abilities during pre-production. The series premiered on 7 July 2006 on Network Ten, and went on to be aired to a worldwide audience of over 250 million. As part of the promotional activities for the series, Tonkin and her co-stars presented the "Best Band" award at the Nickelodeon UK Kids' Choice Awards in October 2007. In 2008, she was nominated for "Best Lead Actress in a Television Series" at the prestigious Australian Film Institute Awards. The series ran for three seasons, with the series finale airing on 16 April 2010.

2010s: International breakthrough and recognition

Tonkin has appeared on the Australian television shows Packed to the Rafters and Home and Away. In September 2010, she made her film debut starring in the Australian action ensemble film Tomorrow, When the War Began. The film revolves around a group of teenagers waging a guerrilla war against an invading foreign power in their fictional hometown of Wirrawee. Tonkin played the rich and uptight Fiona Maxwell. In December 2010, a sequel was announced, in which Tonkin was expected to return, but production never eventuated.
In January 2011, Tonkin moved to Los Angeles to pursue her international acting career. In March 2011, she was cast as Faye Chamberlain in The CW's supernatural drama series The Secret Circle, which premiered on 15 September 2011 to over 3.5 million viewers. The series follows a group of young witches who form a secret coven. Tonkin received critical acclaim for her performance, with critics calling her the break-out star of the series; she was featured on Variety list of "new faces to watch", and named one of 2011's break-out TV stars by E! Online. The show, however, had only one full season and was cancelled on 11 May 2012.

In August 2010, Tonkin was cast in the 3D horror film Bait 3D. Filming took place in the coastal city of Gold Coast, Queensland; the film follows a group of strangers trapped in a supermarket with a pack of great white sharks after a freak tsunami. Tonkin reunited with her H2O: Just Add Water co-star Cariba Heine for this film, which was expected to be released in Australia in September 2012. In August 2012, Tonkin joined the cast of The CW television series The Vampire Diaries, in the recurring role of Hayley, a friend of Tyler's. Once again, she reunited with a co-star from H2O: Just Add Water—this time Claire Holt, who portrays Rebekah Mikaelson on the show.

On 11 January 2013, The CW confirmed that a spin-off series to The Vampire Diaries was in the works, titled The Originals. The series revolves around the Original Vampire family members, and Tonkin would be "heavily featured in the prospective pilot" of the series. The CW confirmed on 13 February that Claire Holt would also join the cast of The Originals, marking the third time Tonkin and Holt have starred together on a show.

On 15 May 2017, SBS announced that Tonkin had been cast in their new four-part drama Safe Harbour about a group of Australians on a sailing vacation who come across a boat of refugees. Tonkin revealed on Instagram that her character's name would be "Olivia". In 2018, she appeared on an episode of The Affair as Delphine, the protégé of an art gallery owner who had an affair with Cole's father.

After her having expressed in interviews a desire to continue working in Australia, it was announced on 20 August 2018 that Tonkin had been cast in Bloom, to be aired on the streaming platform Stan, as the young Gwen Reid, a character whose older version is portrayed by Jacki Weaver. In 2019, Tonkin wrote and directed her first short film, Furlough, which was screened around the world in film festivals in 2020. Since 2019, she has participated in the Tribeca Chanel Women's Filmmaker Program, aimed at empowering female directors.

2020s: Established actress and upcoming work
In April 2021, it was announced that Tonkin would co-star in a horror film titled Night Shift, alongside Lamorne Morris and Madison Hu. The film will be directed by Paul and Benjamin China.

Other projects
Tonkin has appeared in a number of advertisements which include Vauxhall Motors  and was previously signed to Chic Management. Her modelling career includes shoots for Girlfriend, Teen Vogue, Elle Australia, Complex, Miss Vogue, Vogue Australia, Dolly and Free People.

Tonkin appeared in the music video for Miles Fisher's 2011 single "Don't Let Go".

In 2012, Tonkin opened a website about health with friend Teresa Palmer called Your Zen Life. In June 2015, Tonkin announced she was stepping down from her involvement in the site due to work commitments.

Tonkin has appeared as the face of New York-based stylist Ilona Hamer's swimwear line "Matteau Swim" from 2015 to 2017, completing 3 seasons with the brand. She supported the lifestyle clothing line for Witchery in 2015.

In September 2017, Tonkin appeared in the ad campaign "Journey To The Wild Side" for Smythson to promote their latest product range. 

Tonkin is a Chanel brand ambassador. For the April 2018 issue of Vogue Australia, Tonkin underwent another photoshoot in partnership with Chanel makeup director Lucia Pica. She was revealed in September 2018 as one of nine women taking part in a digital campaign for Chanel's Gabrielle line of products.

In October 2020, Tonkin launched her own clothing brand "Lesjour!", a sustainable loungewear brand which Tonkin describes as being inspired by the leisure suit of the 70's and California living. Tonkin cited that the clothing brand was the reason she relocated permanently from New York back to LA - where the brand was designed, manufactured using EcoVero, and ships from. Tonkin stated that she'd had the idea for a clothing brand for two years, and decided to launch it as her job as an actress was affected by the COVID-19 pandemic.

Filmography

Film

Television

Music videos
 "Don't Let Go" (2012) by Miles Fisher, as Female lead

Awards and nominations

References

External links

 
 

1989 births
Living people
21st-century Australian actresses
Actresses from Sydney
Australian child actresses
Australian expatriate actresses in the United States
Australian film actresses
Australian television actresses
The Society Management models